The 1980–81 Nationale A season was the 60th season of the Nationale A, the top level of ice hockey in France. 10 teams participated in the league, and CSG Grenoble won their first league title.

First round

Final round

Relegation

External links
Season on hockeyarchives.info

Fra
1980–81 in French ice hockey
Ligue Magnus seasons